Acacia costiniana, commonly known as Costin's wattle, is a shrub belonging to the genus Acacia and the subgenus Phyllodineae that is endemic to eastern Australia.

Description
Like most species of Acacia it has phyllodes rather than true leaves. The evergreen phyllodes appear crowded and are mostly ascending to erect with an asymmetrically ovate to elliptic shape. The phyllodes have a slightly excentric midrib and obscure lateral nerves. After flowering it forms thinly coriaceous seed pods that are velvety with ferruginous to silvery-ferruginous hairs.

Taxonomy
The species was first formally described by the botanist Mary Tindale in 1980 as part of the work Notes on Australian taxa of Acacia as published in the journal Telopea. It was reclassified as Racosperma costinianum in 2003 by Leslie Pedley then transferred back to the genus Acacia in 2006.

Distribution
It is native to south eastern parts of New South Wales between Captains Flat though to Bombala where it is found on rocky slopes as a part of dry sclerophyll forest and heath communities.

See also
 List of Acacia species

References

costiniana
Flora of New South Wales
Plants described in 1980